SM U-50 was one of 329 submarines in the Imperial German Navy in World War I. She took part in the First Battle of the Atlantic.

Laconia was also the 15th largest ship destroyed by submarine in the war.

Summary of raiding history

References

Notes

Citations

Bibliography

1915 ships
Ships built in Kiel
Ships lost with all hands
U-boats commissioned in 1916
Maritime incidents in 1917
U-boats sunk by mines
U-boats sunk in 1917
Type U 43 submarines
World War I submarines of Germany